The Cape Dory 22 is an American sailboat that was designed by Carl Alberg as a cruiser and first built in 1981.

The design was developed into the Typhoon Senior in 1984, using the same hull molds.

Production
The design was built by Cape Dory Yachts in the United States. A total of 176 examples were completed during its production from 1981 to 1985.

Design
The Cape Dory 22 is a recreational keelboat, built predominantly of fiberglass, with wood trim. The deck is balsa-cored. It has a masthead sloop rig, a raked stem, a raised transom, a keel-mounted rudder controlled by a tiller and a fixed long keel. It displaces  and carries  of ballast.

The fuel tank holds .

The design has accommodation for four people, with a forward "V"-berth in the bow, with a privacy curtain. The galley consists of a sink and ice chest on the port side of the cabin and a two-burner alcohol-fired stove on the starboard side. The head is a portable marine toilet that can be located under the forward berth. Ventilation is provided by an opening hatch forward and four bronze portlights.

The boat's cabin sole is teak and holly, while the remaining wood is teak.

The design has a PHRF racing average handicap of 273 with a high of 252 and low of 282.

Operational history
The boat is supported by an active class club that organizes racing events, the Cape Dory Sailboat Owners Association.

See also
List of sailing boat types

Related development
Alberg 22

Similar sailboats
Buccaneer 220
Capri 22
DS-22
Edel 665
Falmouth Cutter 22
Hunter 22
J/22
Marlow-Hunter 22
Marshall 22
Pearson Electra
Pearson Ensign
Ranger 22
Santana 22
Seaward 22
Spindrift 22
Starwind 223
Tanzer 22
Triton 22
US Yachts US 22

References

Keelboats
1980s sailboat type designs
Sailing yachts
Sailboat type designs by Carl Alberg
Sailboat types built by Cape Dory Yachts